WZ may refer to:

 WZ sex-determination system, also known as the ZW sex-determination system
 WZ theory, a technique for simplifying certain combinatorial summations in mathematics
 Eswatini (FIPS 10-4 country code WZ)
 Westdeutsche Zeitung, a German newspaper
 Wetzlar, Germany
 WinZip, a computer file compression software
 Wizet, a Korean online gaming developer, which uses the file extension 
 W and Z bosons in particle physics